The 2010 season was Busan I'Park FC's 28th season in the K-League in South Korea. Busan I'Park FC is competing in K-League, League Cup and Korean FA Cup.

Current squad

K-League

Korean FA Cup

League Cup

Group stage

Knockout stage

Squad statistics

Appearances and goals

Top scorers

Discipline

Transfer

In

Out

References

 Busan I'Park FC website

South Korean football clubs 2010 season
2010